In mathematics, the partition topology is a topology that can be induced on any set  by partitioning  into disjoint subsets  these subsets form the basis for the topology. There are two important examples which have their own names:
 The  is the topology where  and  Equivalently, 
 The  is defined by letting  and 

Any set  with a partition topology generated by a partition  can be viewed as a pseudometric space with a pseudometric given by: 

This is not a metric unless  yields the discrete topology.

The partition topology provides an important example of the independence of various separation axioms. Unless  is trivial, at least one set in  contains more than one point, and the elements of this set are topologically indistinguishable: the topology does not separate points. Hence  is not a Kolmogorov space, nor a T1 space, a Hausdorff space or an Urysohn space. In a partition topology the complement of every open set is also open, and therefore a set is open if and only if it is closed. Therefore,  is regular, completely regular, normal and completely normal.  is the discrete topology.

See also

References

 

Topological spaces